Hoebee is a surname. Notable people with the surname include:

José Hoebee (born 1954), Dutch singer
Will Hoebee (1947–2012), Dutch record producer and songwriter

See also
Hoeben